Husaini bin Omar (born 10 March 1963) is a Malaysian academic, geologist, researcher, engineer and the incumbent Director-General of Higher Education since 1 February 2021.

Education 
Husaini holds a Bachelor of Science with Honors (Geology) from the University of Malaya in 1988 and a Master of Geological Engineering from the University of Leeds, United Kingdom in 1994. He subsequently obtained a Doctor of Engineering (System Engineering)  from Universiti Putra Malaysia in 2002.

Career 
Husaini has eight years of industry experience as a geological engineer before starting his career as a lecturer at the Faculty of Engineering Universiti Putra Malaysia in 1996. He enjoyed academic and administrative success until he was appointed Deputy Vice Chancellor (Research and Innovation) of UPM on  15 February 2017 before assuming the position of Vice Chancellor of Universiti Malaysia Kelantan on 1 January 2018 until 6 January 2019. He subsequently assumed the duties of chief executive officer of the Malaysian Qualifications Agency (MQA) from 1 June 2020 until 31 January 2021.

Honours 
  :
  Knight Commander of the Order of the Crown of Kelantan (DPMK) – Dato' (2018)
  :
  Knight Commander of the Order of the Crown of Selangor (DPMS) – Dato' (2016)

References

1963 births
Living people
People from Kelantan
Malaysian people of Malay descent
Malaysian Muslims
University of Malaya alumni
Alumni of the University of Leeds
University of Putra Malaysia alumni
Knights Commander of the Order of the Crown of Selangor